Epiphile is a genus of banners in the butterfly family Nymphalidae. There are about 19 described species in Epiphile.

Species
These 19 species belong to the genus Epiphile:

 Epiphile adrasta Hewitson, 1861 (common banner)
 Epiphile chrysites Latreille, 1823
 Epiphile dilecta Röber, 1913
 Epiphile dinora Fassl, 1912
 Epiphile electra Staudinger, 1886
 Epiphile epicaste Hewitson, 1857
 Epiphile epimenes Hewitson, 1857
 Epiphile eriopis Hewitson, 1857
 Epiphile fassli Röber, 1913
 Epiphile grandis Butler, 1872
 Epiphile hermosa De La Maza & Díaz Francés, 1978
 Epiphile hubneri Hewitson, 1861
 Epiphile kalbreyeri Fassl, 1912
 Epiphile lampethusa Doubleday, 1848
 Epiphile negrina Felder, 1862
 Epiphile orea Hübner, 1816/24
 Epiphile plusios Godman & Salvin, 1883
 Epiphile plutonia Bates, 1864
 Epiphile zipa Mengel, 1899

References

Further reading

External links

 

Biblidinae
Articles created by Qbugbot
Nymphalidae genera